The 2012 Atlanta Braves season was the Braves' 16th season of home games at Turner Field, 47th season in Atlanta, and 142nd season overall. After a late season collapse in 2011 kept the Braves from the playoffs, the team returned to the postseason for the second time in three seasons as a Wild Card team, with a record of 94-68. They lost to the St. Louis Cardinals in the one-game Wild Card Playoff.

Offseason

Areas of interest

Following the conclusion of the 2011 season, Braves general manager Frank Wren highlighted several important areas to improve during the offseason. Since most players were committed contractually to the team in 2012, Wren acknowledged that he would likely make few major changes. One spot that was mentioned for a major overhaul was the shortstop position, where Alex González had played since the Yunel Escobar trade with Toronto in July 2010. González entered the offseason as a free agent and proved too expensive for the team. Wren ultimately allowed prospect Tyler Pastornicky the starting duties in 2012, until he was replaced by Andrelton Simmons in mid-June. When Simmons was hurt in July, Jack Wilson, Paul Janish, and Martín Prado filled in for him. While center fielder Michael Bourn returned to his position in 2012, Wren also suggested that the corner outfield positions were areas of contention. In 2011, the Atlanta outfielders finished the season last in the National League in on-base plus slugging and slugging percentage. Wren stated that right fielder Jason Heyward and left fielder Martín Prado had no guarantee of getting the starting jobs in 2012. On the day after the Braves were eliminated from the playoffs in 2011, Wren said that veteran starter Derek Lowe was unlikely to have a spot in the starting rotation in 2012, due his poor performance in 2011 and a plethora of rookie pitching talent in the Braves farm system. With Lowe guaranteed $15 million in 2012, Wren projected that any of Lowe's salary picked up by another team would significantly assist his efforts to find a shortstop or outfielder. By the end of October, Lowe was traded to the Indians.

Country Caravan
The Braves organization announced the third annual "Braves Country Caravan" on December 19, 2011. Players, coaches, and personalities of the Braves organization who participate in the Caravan will travel to twenty cities throughout the southeast United States, including ones in Georgia, Alabama, South Carolina, North Carolina, and Tennessee, from January 27 to February 9, 2012. In previous years a select few players and personnel have traveled to one venue to meet fans and sign autographs while others travel to another location. Braves president John Schuerholtz praised the Caravan as an excellent opportunity for the organization to personally thank fans for their support and to reach out to local communities. Noting that the Caravan would make over forty stops and travel over three thousand miles, the organization revealed specific venues and participating members with a press release on January 19, 2012.

New alternate uniforms
The Braves held a ceremony on February 6 unveiling new home alternate uniforms to be worn in 2012 with Chipper Jones, Dan Uggla, and Brian McCann modeling the new uniform and Hank Aaron present to help introduce it. The new  is a cream color, instead of white, and has a retro look reminiscent of the uniforms from the days in Milwaukee and first two years in Atlanta with the uniform number on the front of the jersey instead of a tomahawk. The sleeve of the uniform will have a logo with two tomahawks crossing with "1876" (representing the organization's first year in the National League) above it and "Atlanta Braves" below the crossing tomahawks. The Braves also announced that the team will wear the new uniforms for all Saturday and Sunday home games. The red jerseys previously worn since 2005 for Sunday home games will now be worn for Friday home games.

Offseason additions and subtractions

†Player released during 2011 season
*Player spent entire 2011 season in Minor Leagues
**Player was non-roster invitee to Spring training (not on 40-man roster)

Timeline
Names highlighted in bold appear on the table above.

September 2011
September 29: On the day following the historic elimination of the 2011 Atlanta Braves from playoff contention, Frank Wren announced that manager Fredi González and the entire coaching staff from 2011 would return to their respective roles in 2012. The following day, however, after having a meeting with hitting coach Larry Parrish, Wren announced that Parrish would not return to the coaching staff in 2012. He stated that he would spend this offseason seeking a successor to Parrish. With Parrish's departure, the Braves will now have a third hitting coach in three seasons after removing Terry Pendleton from the role after the 2010 season.

October 2011

October 21: Three weeks after firing Larry Parrish from his hitting coach duties, the Braves announced that Parrish would be succeeded in 2012 by Greg Walker, the former hitting coach for the Chicago White Sox from 2003 to 2011. Walker had stepped down as the White Sox hitting coach immediately following the end of the 2011 season. In the nine seasons Walker served as hitting coach, the White Sox offense ranked third in the Majors in home runs and seventh in slugging percentage. On the other hand, in 2011 the White Sox offense only ranked eleventh in the American League in runs, eighth in average, and seventh in on-base percentage. In an accompanying move, the Braves hired Scott Fletcher to assist Walker in his duties and to serve as an on-site advance scout.

October 31: Three days following the conclusion of the 2011 World Series, the Braves began to make some organizational roster moves. In the first trade of the offseason in the Major Leagues, the Braves traded struggling starting pitcher Derek Lowe to the Cleveland Indians in return for High-A lefty reliever Chris Jones. In addition, the Indians agreed to pay $5 million of Lowe's guaranteed $15 million salary in 2012. Lowe served as the Atlanta Braves' Opening Day starter in 2009, 2010, and 2011. Due to his struggles in 2011, however, Lowe likely would have merely served in a middle relief role for the bullpen in 2012. On the same day, the Braves announced that they had declined the $10.65 million option for center fielder Nate McLouth, ending his lackluster tenure as an Atlanta Brave. McLouth later signed a one-year contract to return to the Pittsburgh Pirates on December 7. Additionally, the Braves decided to exercise the $1.5 million option for utility man Eric Hinske, assuring his return for the 2012 season.

November 2011
November 2: The Braves announced several internal roster moves that allowed for additional space on the forty-man roster. After spending the month of September 2011 with the Major League club, the team outrighted catcher J. C. Boscán, right-handed pitcher Stephen Marek, and outfielders Antoan Richardson and Wilkin Ramírez to the triple-A affiliate Gwinnett Braves. In addition, the Braves filled one roster spot with starting pitcher Todd Redmond, who has spent the previous three seasons pitching for Gwinnett. Accumulating a record of 10–8 with a 2.92 ERA in 2011, Redmond is unlikely to have playing time with the Major League club due to existing pitching depth.

November 3: With the beginning of free agency season, the Braves were able to remove offseason free agents from the forty-man roster. The free agents for this offseason include shortstop Alex González, infielder Jack Wilson, and veteran relievers Scott Linebrink and George Sherrill. In conjunction with the moves made on November 2, Frank Wren and his staff now have seven roster spots that will be filled with potential offseason acquisitions or prospects they wish to protect from the Rule 5 draft.

November 23: After becoming a free agent following the conclusion to the 2011 season, the Braves decided to decline arbitration to shortstop Álex González. If the team had accepted his arbitration they would have received a compensatory draft pick between the first and second rounds of the 2012 MLB draft if González signed with another team. The move made it very clear that González would not return as the starting shortstop in 2012. González looked to receive a multi-year contract on the free agent market, something the Braves were not willing to offer due to rising prospects such as Tyler Pastornicky and Andrelton Simmons. On December 8, González signed a contract with the Milwaukee Brewers for one year and a vesting option for the 2013 season.

December 2011
December 8: As a part of the Rule 5 draft at the 2012 Winter Meetings, the Braves selected left-handed relief pitcher Robert Fish from the Los Angeles Angels of Anaheim in the Major League Phase. Under draft rules, Fish must be kept on the Braves 25-man Major League roster for the entire 2012 season. If waived, Fish must first be offered back to the Angels. Left-handed relief pitcher George Sherrill departs the club as a free agent, later signing with the Seattle Mariners on December 30,  after serving as the left-handed specialist to the Braves in 2011. With the departure of Sherrill, Fish has the opportunity to provide that role to the bullpen in 2012. No players were selected from the Braves organization by other teams in the Draft.

December 13: Following the deadline to tender contracts to arbitration-eligible players the previous night, the Braves declined to tender 2012 contracts to relief pitcher Peter Moylan and infielder Brooks Conrad, who would later be signed to a Minor League contract by the Brewers in January.  All other arbitration-eligible players on the Braves roster, including center fielder Michael Bourn, left fielder Martín Prado, starting pitcher Jair Jurrjens, and reliever Eric O'Flaherty, were tendered contracts.

January 2012
January 13: After being named in trade rumors for much of the offseason, Braves utility man and 2011 starting left-fielder Martín Prado signed a one-year contract worth $4.75 million with the Braves for the 2012 season. The move assures that Prado will not go through the salary arbitration process and will likely return to the team for the 2012 campaign.

On the same day, backup infielder Jack Wilson agreed to terms for a one-year contract worth $1 million. Wilson was acquired by the organization from the Seattle Mariners on August 31, 2011. The 34-year-old veteran will provide a dependable backup for Tyler Pastornicky, the projected starting shortstop who will be making his Major League debut. During the offseason, Wilson and Pastornicky have already been training together.

January 17: Only days after agreeing to avoid arbitration with Prado, the Braves agreed to a one-year contract worth $2.49 million with reliever Eric O'Flaherty. Making $895,000 in 2011, the left-handed pitcher posted a 0.98 ERA in 78 appearances, leading all Major League relievers. O'Flaherty also became the first pitcher in Major League history to post a sub-1.00 ERA with at least 70 appearances. Hours later, the Braves avoided arbitration on starting pitcher Jair Jurrjens and center fielder Michael Bourn, the final two arbitration-eligible players on the Braves roster, by tendering them both one-year contracts. Both clients of Scott Boras, Jurrjens will receive $5.5 million and Bourn will receive $6.845 million in 2012. Later the same day, the Braves announced the signing of free agent relief pitcher Peter Moylan to a one-year Minor League contract worth $1 million. Moylan, who suffered injuries through most of the 2011 season, was not tendered a contract by the Braves which would have allowed him to undergo the arbitration process. Expecting around $2 million through arbitration, the Braves felt Moylan's surgically repaired right shoulder posed too much of an injury risk. With his contract including an invitation to the Major League spring training camp, Moylan will have an opportunity to prove his health.

Spring training
The Braves officially announced their 2012 spring training schedule on November 16, 2011. Pitchers and catchers were scheduled to report on February 19 and all other players were due to report by February 24. The 34-game spring slate began on March 3 against the Detroit Tigers in Champion Stadium, located at the ESPN Wide World of Sports Complex in Lake Buena Vista. Champion Stadium has been the Braves' Spring training home in Florida for the past fifteen seasons.

Non-roster invitees
The team announced on November 22, 2011 the signing of eleven Minor League free agents and invited them all to the Major League Spring training camp. Four of these players spent significant time at the Major League level in 2011, including relief pitchers Adam Russell and Dusty Hughes. Russell pitched in 36 games for the Tampa Bay Rays while Hughes pitched in 15 games for the Minnesota Twins. Infielder Drew Sutton batted .315 in 54 at-bats for the Boston Red Sox and infielder Josh Wilson served as a backup infielder for the Milwaukee Brewers during the second half of the season. Other players signed include pitchers Jason Rice and Yohan Flande, catchers J. C. Boscán and José Yépez, outfielders Luis Durango and Jordan Parraz, and infielder Ernesto Mejia. On January 13, 2011 the team extended invitations to several promising prospects. Rising third baseman Joe Terdoslavich and starting pitcher Sean Gilmartin highlight the group of promising players set to showcase their skills. Catcher Christian Bethancourt, shortstop Andrelton Simmons, center fielder Todd Cunningham, pitcher Zeke Spruill, and outfielder Stefan Gartrell will also appear as non-roster invitees.

Injuries
After dealing with increasing back pain for several seasons, Braves starter Tim Hudson underwent back surgery on November 28, 2011. Hudson stated that he had been using anti-inflammatory medication for the past two years to deal with the pain. After the procedure, Hudson's mobility has greatly improved and he anticipates that the surgery will prolong his career. Because the procedure requires three to six months for proper recovery, Hudson does not expect his 2012 debut to come until early May. In his absence Randall Delgado will occupy his rotation spot. Recovering with haste, Hudson started the final exhibition game in Florida on April 2 against the New York Mets. In two scoreless innings of work, Hudson allowed only one hit and struck out two while throwing every pitch in his arsenal.

Driving to Champion Stadium for the first day of workouts for pitchers and catchers, Braves starter Tommy Hanson was involved in a one-car accident that caused him to bump his head around seven in the morning on February 20, 2012. After arriving at the stadium, Hanson informed the medical staff of the incident, stating that he was feeling abnormal. Seeking medical attention, Hanson was diagnosed with a Grade 1 concussion, providing a delay in his spring workouts. The Braves medical staff performed several concussion impact tests on Hanson to gauge when a return to normal workouts would be appropriate. Hanson did not expect to miss his first start of the regular season. After a full recovery and ample time for preparation during spring training, Hanson was assigned as the Opening Day starter, making his first start against the New York Mets on April 5.

On the same day as he announced his retirement from baseball, Braves third baseman Chipper Jones also announced that he would be undergoing surgery to repair a torn meniscus in his left knee, a process that would place him on the Disabled List through Opening Day on April 5. Jones has stated repeatedly that he will make his first appearance of the season in the Home Opener on April 13 against the Milwaukee Brewers.

Spring transactions
Names highlighted in bold appear on the table above.

Nearing the end of their spring training schedule, the Braves made three significant transactions to bolster their Opening Day roster. On March 30, the Braves signed free agent Liván Hernández only hours after he was released from the Houston Astros camp. Signed to a one-year contract, Hernández will provide a veteran presence in the bullpen and act as a long reliever and, if necessary, a spot starter in the event of an injury. On April 1, the organization traded Minor League pitching prospect J. J. Hoover to the Cincinnati Reds for third baseman Juan Francisco. Wren stated that the team had coveted Francisco for the past few years. Francisco will provide Prado a backup at third when Chipper cannot man the position. Finally, on April 3, the Braves signed veteran reliever Chad Durbin to a one-year contract after he was released from the Washington Nationals camp. Durbin will provide added depth to the bullpen.

Braves Future Stars Game
Rather than concluding Spring training with two games at Turner Field against a Major League team as had been the tradition in previous seasons, the Braves played their final exhibition game on April 3 at Coolray Field, the regular season home of the Triple-A affiliate Gwinnett Braves. The complete Major League club hosted a team composed of the top prospects in the Braves' farm system. The Braves Future Stars game is praised as an opportunity to highlight upcoming prospects. The organization announced on February 3 that former Braves manager Bobby Cox, who retired following the 2010 season, would manage the Future Stars team against the Major League club.

In the top of the first Matt Lipka, the first batter of the game, was walked by Braves pitcher Mike Minor. After stealing second and advancing on an error, Lipka scored on a groundout that gave the Future Stars an early lead. Braves starting second baseman Dan Uggla launched a solo home run in the bottom of the second off Futures starter Sean Gilmartin to tie the game at one. The home run was Uggla's seventh of the Spring, tying him for the Major League lead. Liván Hernández, who was acquired in a trade only a few days before, relieved Minor in the fourth, throwing a scoreless frame. Reliever Cristhian Martínez followed in the fifth, allowing the Futures two runs to give them a lead of 3–1. In the bottom of the inning, an RBI double by starting center fielder Michael Bourn plated Juan Francisco, also just acquired in a trade a few days prior. Martín Prado continued the scoring with an RBI triple to score Bourn and starting catcher Brian McCann followed with an RBI double to plate Prado, giving the Major League team a 4–3 advantage. After scoreless outings by Kris Medlen and Eric O'Flaherty, the remainder of the game was canceled due to rain. Manager Fredi González stated that Jonny Venters and Craig Kimbrel would have pitched the eighth and ninth innings, respectively.

April 3, 2012
7:05 p.m. (EDT) at Coolray Field in Lawrenceville, Georgia.

Regular season

Opening Day
After finishing their spring training schedule two days prior, the Atlanta Braves began their season on Opening Day as the guests for the New York Mets home opener at Citi Field on April 5. Tommy Hanson, making the first Opening Day start of his career, faced Mets ace Johan Santana, who was making his first Major League appearance since September 2010. The first game proved to be dominated by defense and pitching. In the bottom of the sixth, Mets third baseman David Wright singled home center fielder Andrés Torres to give the Mets a 1–0 advantage, which would end up being the final score of the game. Hanson took the loss, giving up just the one earned run in five plus innings of work. Kris Medlen and Jonny Venters followed with three scoreless innings in relief, but the offense could never find the scoreboard. The Opening Day loss was only the second in the last seven seasons and the first since 2008.

Chipper Jones retirement
After nineteen seasons with the Atlanta Braves, third baseman Chipper Jones announced on March 22, 2012 that he would retire following the end of the season. Jones held a news conference the same day at Champion Stadium, the Spring training home of the team. The entire Braves team and former manager Bobby Cox were in attendance for the official announcement. Having spent the first eighteen seasons of his career with the Braves, Chipper leads all active players in years of service with one club. His first year with the team, the 1995 season, was the year the Braves won their first World Championship in Atlanta. Chipper remains as the last active player from that Championship team. After sitting out the first four games of the season due to a knee injury, Jones hit a home run in his season debut against the Houston Astros on April 10. Five days later, Jones hit a home run in his first game of the season at Turner Field.

Game log

|-  style="text-align:center; background:#fbb;"
| 1 || April 5 || @ Mets || 0–1 || Ramírez (1–0) || Hanson (0–1) || Francisco (1) || 42,080 || 2:39 || 0–1
|-  style="text-align:center; background:#fbb;"
| 2 || April 7 || @ Mets || 2–4 || Dickey (1–0) || Jurrjens (0–1) || Francisco (2) || 39,526 || 2:53 || 0–2
|-  style="text-align:center; background:#fbb;"
| 3 || April 8 || @ Mets || 5–7 || Niese (1–0) || Minor (0–1) || Francisco (3) || 27,855 || 2:46 || 0–3
|-  style="text-align:center; background:#fbb;"
| 4 || April 9 || @ Astros || 3–8 || Happ (1–0) || Beachy (0–1) || || 17,095 || 2:46 || 0–4
|-  style="text-align:center; background:#bfb;"
| 5 || April 10 || @ Astros || 6–4 || Hanson (1–1) || Weiland (0–1) || Kimbrel (1) || 22,036 || 3:12 || 1–4
|-  style="text-align:center; background:#bfb;"
| 6 || April 11 || @ Astros || 6–3 || Delgado (1–0) || Rodríguez (0–1) || Kimbrel (2) || 18,225 || 3:21 || 2–4
|-  style="text-align:center; background:#bfb;"
| 7 || April 13 || Brewers || 10–8 || Venters (1–0) || Rodríguez (0–1) || Kimbrel (3) || 50,635 || 3:22 || 3–4
|-  style="text-align:center; background:#bfb;"
| 8 || April 14 || Brewers || 2–1 || Minor (1–1) || Marcum (1–1) || Kimbrel (4) || 37,408 || 2:44 || 4–4
|-  style="text-align:center; background:#bfb;"
| 9 || April 15 || Brewers || 7–4 || Beachy (1–1) || Narveson (1–1) || || 30,831 || 2:58 || 5–4
|-  style="text-align:center; background:#fbb;"
| 10 || April 16 || Mets || 1–6 || Gee (1–1) || Hanson (1–2) || || 16,161 || 2:24 || 5–5
|-  style="text-align:center; background:#bfb;"
| 11 || April 17 || Mets || 9–3 || Delgado (2–0) || Santana (0–2) || || 18,732 || 2:53 || 6–5
|-  style="text-align:center; background:#bfb;"
| 12 || April 18 || Mets || 14–6 || Martínez (1–0) || Dickey (2–1) || || 17,909 || 3:17 || 7–5
|-  style="text-align:center; background:#bfb;"
| 13 || April 19 || @ Diamondbacks || 10–2 || Minor (2–1) || Collmenter (0–1) || || 18,110 || 2:49 || 8–5
|-  style="text-align:center; background:#bfb;"
| 14 || April 20 || @ Diamondbacks || 9–1 || Beachy (2–1) || Cahill (1–1) || || 27,761 || 2:50 || 9–5
|-  style="text-align:center; background:#bfb;"
| 15 || April 21 || @ Diamondbacks || 3–2 || Hanson (2–2) || Saunders (1–1) || Kimbrel (5) || 30,188 || 2:17 || 10–5
|-  style="text-align:center; background:#fbb;"
| 16 || April 22 || @ Diamondbacks || 4–6 || Kennedy (3–0) || Delgado (2–1) || Putz (5) || 28,679 || 2:36 || 10–6
|-  style="text-align:center; background:#fbb;"
| 17 || April 23 || @ Dodgers || 2–7 || Capuano (2–0) || Jurrjens (0–2) || || 26,376 || 2:49 || 10–7
|-  style="text-align:center; background:#bfb;"
| 18 || April 24 || @ Dodgers || 4–3 || O'Flaherty (1–0) || Guerra (1–2) || Kimbrel (6) || 44,014 || 2:59 || 11–7
|-  style="text-align:center; background:#bfb;"
| 19 || April 25 || @ Dodgers || 4–2 || Venters (2–0) || Guerra (1–3) || Kimbrel (7) || 26,345 || 2:54 || 12–7
|-  style="text-align:center; background:#bfb;"
| 20 || April 27 || Pirates || 6–1 || Hanson (3–2) || Burnett (1–1) || Medlen (1) || 36,215 || 2:57 || 13–7
|-  style="text-align:center; background:#fbb;"
| 21 || April 28 || Pirates || 2–4 || Bédard (1–4) || Delgado (2–2) || Hanrahan (4) || 34,086 || 3:13 || 13–8
|-  style="text-align:center; background:#bfb;"
| 22 || April 29 || Pirates || 4–3 || Hudson (1–0) || Correia (1–1) || Kimbrel (8) || 30,419 || 3:25 || 14–8
|-  style="text-align:center; background:#fbb;"
| 23 || April 30 || Pirates || 3–9 || McDonald (1–1) || Minor (2–2) || || 17,181 || 2:49 || 14–9
|-

|-  style="text-align:center; background:#fbb;"
| 24 || May 1 || Phillies || 2–4 || Bastardo (1–1) || Venters (2–1) || Papelbon (9) || 21,640 || 2:46 || 14–10
|-  style="text-align:center; background:#bfb;"
| 25 || May 2 || Phillies || 15–13 (11) || Durbin (1–0) || Sanches (0–1) || || 26,504 || 4:00 || 15–10
|-  style="text-align:center; background:#fbb;"
| 26 || May 3 || Phillies || 0–4 || Blanton (3–3) || Delgado (2–3) || || 24,015 || 2:02 || 15–11
|-  style="text-align:center; background:#bfb;"
| 27 || May 4 || @ Rockies || 9–8 (11) || Durbin (2–0) || Escalona (0–1) || Kimbrel (9) || 33,184 || 4:00 || 16–11
|-  style="text-align:center; background:#bfb;"
| 28 || May 5 || @ Rockies || 13–9 || Martínez (2–0) || Rogers (0–2) || Hernández (1) || 40,013 || 3:27 || 17–11
|-  style="text-align:center; background:#bfb;"
| 29 || May 6 || @ Rockies || 7–2 || Beachy (3–1) || Nicasio (2–1) || Martínez (1) || 45,330 || 2:43 || 18–11
|-  style="text-align:center; background:#fbb;"
| 30 || May 7 || @ Cubs || 1–5 || Samardzija (4–1) || Hanson (3–3) || || 36,307 || 2:45 || 18–12
|-  style="text-align:center; background:#bfb;"
| 31 || May 8 || @ Cubs || 3–1 || Medlen (1–0) || Wood (0–2) || Kimbrel (10) || 38,523 || 2:47 || 19–12
|-  style="text-align:center; background:#fbb;"
| 32 || May 9 || @ Cubs || 0–1 || Maholm (4–2) || Hudson (1–1) || Dolis (3) || 31,904 || 2:05 || 19–13
|-  style="text-align:center; background:#bfb;"
| 33 || May 11 || @ Cardinals || 9–7 (12) || Hernández (1–0) || McClellan (0–1) || Kimbrel (11) || 45,190 || 3:56 || 20–13
|-  style="text-align:center; background:#bfb;"
| 34 || May 12 || @ Cardinals || 7–2 || Beachy (4–1) || Wainwright (2–4) || || 44,157 || 2:55 || 21–13
|-  style="text-align:center; background:#bfb;"
| 35 || May 13 || @ Cardinals || 7–4 || Hanson (4–3) || Lynn (6–1) || || 45,729 || 3:33 || 22–13
|-  style="text-align:center; background:#fbb;"
| 36 || May 14 || Reds || 1–3 || Ondrusek (3–0) || Venters (2–2) || Marshall (6) || 19,697 || 3:02 || 22–14
|-  style="text-align:center; background:#bfb;"
| 37 || May 15 || Reds || 6–2 || Hudson (2–1)|| Cueto (4–1)|| || 21,530 || 2:51|| 23–14
|-  style="text-align:center; background:#fbb;"
| 38 || May 16 || Marlins || 4–8 || Buehrle (3–4) || Minor (2–3) || || 21,106 || 2:49 || 23–15
|-  style="text-align:center; background:#bfb;"
| 39 || May 17 || Marlins || 7–0 || Beachy (5–1) || Nolasco (4–2) || || 27,724 || 2:42 || 24–15
|-  style="text-align:center; background:#bfb;"
| 40 || May 18 || @ Rays || 5–3 || Hanson (5–3) || Shields (6–2) || Kimbrel (12) || 19,693 || 3:04 || 25–15
|-  style="text-align:center; background:#fbb;"
| 41 || May 19 || @ Rays || 2–5 || Cobb (1–0) || Delgado (2–4) || Rodney (13) || 27,433 || 2:48 || 25–16
|-  style="text-align:center; background:#bfb;"
| 42 || May 20 || @ Rays || 2–0 || Hudson (3–1) || Price (6–3) || Kimbrel (13) || 24,759 || 2:34 || 26–16
|-  style="text-align:center; background:#fbb;"
| 43 || May 21 || @ Reds || 1–4 || Leake (1–5) || Minor (2–4) || Marshall (8) || 17,606 || 2:34 || 26–17
|-  style="text-align:center; background:#fbb;"
| 44 || May 22 || @ Reds || 3–4 || Latos (3–2) || Beachy (5–2) || Chapman (2) || 26,438 || 2:33 || 26–18
|-  style="text-align:center; background:#fbb;"
| 45 || May 23 || @ Reds || 1–2 || Chapman (4–0) || Martínez (2–1) || || 20,411 || 2:49 || 26–19
|-  style="text-align:center; background:#fbb;"
| 46 || May 24 || @ Reds || 3–6 || Baliey (3–3) || Delgado (2–5) || Ondrusek (2) || 23,312 || 2:29 || 26–20
|-  style="text-align:center; background:#fbb;"
| 47 || May 25 || Nationals || 4–7 || Wang (1–0) || Hudson (3–2) || Clippard (2) || 37,663 || 2:55 || 26–21
|-  style="text-align:center; background:#fbb;"
| 48 || May 26 || Nationals || 4–8 || Strasburg (5–1) || Medlen (1–1) || Clippard (3) || 42,698 || 3:10 || 26–22
|-  style="text-align:center; background:#fbb;"
| 49 || May 27 || Nationals || 2–7 || Gonzalez (7–1) || Beachy (5–3) || || 38,543 || 3:10 || 26–23
|-  style="text-align:center; background:#fbb;"
| 50 || May 28 || Cardinals || 2–8 || Lynn (8–1) || Hanson (5–4) || || 42,426 || 3:10 || 26–24
|-  style="text-align:center; background:#bfb;"
| 51 || May 29 || Cardinals || 5–4 || Delgado (3–5) || Westbrook (4–4) || Kimbrel (14) || 26,218 || 2:43 || 27–24
|-  style="text-align:center; background:#bfb;"
| 52 || May 30 || Cardinals || 10–7 || Venters (3–2) || Rzepczynski (0–3) || Kimbrel (15) || 28,474 || 2:44 || 28–24
|-

|-  style="text-align:center; background:#bbb;"
| – || June 1 || @ Nationals ||colspan=7|Game Postponed (rain) (rescheduled July 21)
|-  style="text-align:center; background:#fbb;"
| 53 || June 2 || @ Nationals || 0–2 || Strasburg (6–1) || Beachy (5–4) || Clippard (4) || 41,042 || 2:35 || 28–25
|-  style="text-align:center; background:#bfb;"
| 54 || June 3 || @ Nationals || 3–2 || Hanson (6–4) || Gonzalez (7–2) || Kimbrel (16) || 38,046 || 2:38 || 29–25
|-  style="text-align:center; background:#bfb;"
| 55 || June 5 || @ Marlins || 11–0 || Hudson (4–2) || Sánchez (3–4) || || 25,432 || 2:36 || 30–25
|-  style="text-align:center; background:#bfb;"
| 56 || June 6 || @ Marlins || 2–1 || Delgado (4–5) || Johnson (3–4) || Kimbrel (17)  || 22,619 || 2:30 || 31–25
|-  style="text-align:center; background:#bfb;"
| 57 || June 7 || @ Marlins || 8–2 || Minor (3–4) || Buehrle (5–6) || || 22,402 || 3:14 || 32–25
|-  style="text-align:center; background:#bfb;"
| 58 || June 8 || Blue Jays || 4–3 (10) || Martínez (3–1) || Cordero (1–4) || || 42,488 || 3:53 || 33–25
|-  style="text-align:center; background:#bfb;"
| 59 || June 9 || Blue Jays || 5–2 || Hanson (7–4) || Hutchison (5–3) || Kimbrel (18) || 32,819 || 2:34 || 34–25
|-  style="text-align:center; background:#fbb;"
| 60 || June 10 || Blue Jays || 4–12 || Villanueva (1–0) || Hernández (1–1) || || 20,222 || 3:14 || 34–26
|-  style="text-align:center; background:#fbb;"
| 61 || June 11 || Yankees || 0–3 || Nova (8–2) || Delgado (4–6) || || 42,669 || 3:01 || 34–27
|-  style="text-align:center; background:#fbb;"
| 62 || June 12 || Yankees || 4–6 || Sabathia (8–3) || Venters (3–3) || Soriano (10) || 41,452 || 3:04 || 34–28
|-  style="text-align:center; background:#fbb;"
| 63 || June 13 || Yankees || 2–3 || Kuroda (6–6) || Hudson (4–3) || Soriano (11) || 48,938 || 3:36 || 34–29
|-  style="text-align:center; background:#bfb;"
| 64 || June 15 || Orioles || 4–2 || Durbin (3–0) || Matusz (5–7) || Kimbrel (19) || 30,384 || 2:55 || 35–29
|-  style="text-align:center; background:#fbb;"
| 65 || June 16 || Orioles || 0–5 || Hammel (7–2) || Beachy (5–5) || || 41,131 || 2:22 || 35–30
|-  style="text-align:center; background:#fbb;"
| 66 || June 17 || Orioles || 0–2 || Chen (7–2) || Delgado (4–7) || Johnson (20) || 29,530 || 2:33 || 35–31
|-  style="text-align:center; background:#fbb;"
| 67 || June 18 || @ Yankees || 2–6 || Sabathia (9–3) || Minor (3–5) || || 42,709 || 2:45 || 35–32
|-  style="text-align:center; background:#bfb;"
| 68 || June 19 || @ Yankees || 4–3 || Hudson (5–3) || Kuroda (6–7) || Kimbrel (20) || 41,219 || 2:57 || 36–32
|-  style="text-align:center; background:#bfb;"
| 69 || June 20 || @ Yankees || 10–5 || Hanson (8–4) || Hughes (7–6) || || 45,094 || 3:21 || 37–32
|-  style="text-align:center; background:#bfb;"
| 70 || June 22 || @ Red Sox || 4–1 || Jurrjens (1–2) || Lester (4–5) || Kimbrel (21) || 37,281 || 2:55 || 38–32
|-  style="text-align:center; background:#fbb;"
| 71 || June 23 || @ Red Sox || 4–8 || Morales (1–1) || Delgado (4–8) || || 37,782 || 3:03 || 38–33
|-  style="text-align:center; background:#fbb;"
| 72 || June 24 || @ Red Sox || 4–9 || Cook (1–1) || Minor (3–6) || || 37,565 || 2:55 || 38–34
|-  style="text-align:center; background:#bfb;"
| 73 || June 26 || Diamondbacks || 8–1 || Hudson (6–3)  || Hudson (3–2) || || 25,513 || 3:01 || 39–34
|-  style="text-align:center; background:#bfb;"
| 74 || June 27 || Diamondbacks || 6–4 || Hanson (9–4) || Cahill (6–6) || Kimbrel (22) || 20,039 || 2:35 || 40–34
|-  style="text-align:center; background:#fbb;"
| 75 || June 28 || Diamondbacks || 2–3 || Hernandez (1–1) || Kimbrel (0–1) || Putz (14) || 21,913 || 3:13 || 40–35
|-  style="text-align:center; background:#fbb;"
| 76 || June 29 || Nationals || 4–5 || Burnett (1–1) || Durbin (3–1) || Clippard (13) || 32,299 || 3:15 || 40–36
|-  style="text-align:center; background:#bfb;"
| 77 || June 30 || Nationals || 7–5 || Minor (4–6) || Strasburg (9–3) || Kimbrel (23) || 26,491 || 3:14 || 41–36
|-

|-  style="text-align:center; background:#fbb;"
| 78 || July 1 || Nationals || 4–8 || Gonzalez (11–3) || Hudson (6–4) || || 18,796 || 3:02 || 41–37
|-  style="text-align:center; background:#fbb;"
| 79 || July 2 || Cubs || 1–4 || Samardzija (6–7) || Hanson (9–5) || Russell (2) || 22,292 || 2:32 || 41–38
|-  style="text-align:center; background:#bfb;"
| 80 || July 3 || Cubs || 10–3 || Jurrjens (2–2) || Volstad (0–7) || || 27,834 || 3:01 || 42–38
|-  style="text-align:center; background:#fbb;"
| 81 || July 4 || Cubs || 1–5 || Maholm (6–6) || Delgado (4–9) || || 40,604 || 2:46 || 42–39
|-  style="text-align:center; background:#bfb;"
| 82 || July 5 || Cubs || 7–3 || Minor (5–6) || Garza (4–7) || || 24,408 || 2:50 || 43–39
|-  style="text-align:center; background:#bfb;"
| 83 || July 6 || @ Phillies || 5–0 || Hudson (7–4) || Bastardo (2–3) ||  || 44,441 || 2:33 || 44–39
|-  style="text-align:center; background:#bfb;"
| 84 || July 7 || @ Phillies || 6–3 || Hanson (10–5) || Blanton (7–8) || Kimbrel (24) || 44,797 || 2:47 || 45–39
|-  style="text-align:center; background:#bfb;"
| 85 || July 8 || @ Phillies || 4–3 || Jurrjens (3–2) || Valdés (2–2) || Kimbrel (25) || 43,881 || 2:48 || 46–39
|-  style="text-align:center; background:khaki;"
| – || July 10 || colspan="8"|2012 Major League Baseball All-Star Game in Kansas City, Missouri
|-  style="text-align:center; background:#bfb;"
| 86 || July 13 || Mets || 7–5 || Martínez (4–1) || Young (2–3) || Kimbrel (26) || 37,020 || 3:41 || 47–39
|-  style="text-align:center; background:#bfb;"
| 87 || July 14 || Mets || 8–7 || Varvaro (1–0) || Parnell (2–2) || Kimbrel (27) || 32,565 || 3:31 || 48–39
|-  style="text-align:center; background:#bfb;"
| 88 || July 15 || Mets || 6–1 || Sheets (1–0) || Santana (6–6) || || 23,382 || 2:40 || 49–39
|-  style="text-align:center; background:#fbb;"
| 89 || July 17 || Giants || 0–9 || Zito (8–6) || Jurrjens (3–3) || || 29,623 || 3:00 || 49–40
|-  style="text-align:center; background:#fbb;"
| 90 || July 18 || Giants || 4–9 (11) || Casilla (3–4) || Varvaro (1–1) || || 29,410 || 4:08 || 49–41
|-  style="text-align:center; background:#bfb;"
| 91 || July 19 || Giants || 3–2 || Hudson (8–4) || Bumgarner (11–6) || Kimbrel (28) || 29,635 || 2:21 || 50–41
|-  style="text-align:center; background:#bfb;"
| 92 || July 20 || @ Nationals || 11–10 (11) || O'Flaherty (2–0) || Gorzelanny (2–2) || Durbin (1) || 34,228 || 4:21 || 51–41
|-  style="text-align:center; background:#bfb;"
| 93 || July 21 || @ Nationals || 4–0 || Sheets (2–0) || Jackson (5–6) || || 28,745 || 3:07 || 52–41
|-  style="text-align:center; background:#fbb;"
| 94 || July 21 || @ Nationals || 2–5 || Lannan (1–0) || Martínez (4–2) || Clippard (16) || 40,047 || 2:56 || 52–42
|-  style="text-align:center; background:#fbb;"
| 95 || July 22 || @ Nationals || 2–9 || Detwiler (5–3) || Jurrjens (3–4) || || 34,917 || 2:51 || 52–43
|-  style="text-align:center; background:#fbb;"
| 96 || July 23 || @ Marlins || 1–2 || Johnson (6–7) || Minor (5–7) || Cishek (3) || 29,019 || 2:33 || 52–44
|-  style="text-align:center; background:#bfb;"
| 97 || July 24 || @ Marlins || 4–3 || Hudson (9–4) || LeBlanc (1–1) || Kimbrel (29) || 25,616 || 2:36 || 53–44
|-  style="text-align:center; background:#bfb;"
| 98 || July 25 || @ Marlins || 7–1 || Hanson (11–5) || Nolasco (8–9) || || 36,711 || 2:46 || 54–44
|-  style="text-align:center; background:#bfb;"
| 99 || July 27 || Phillies || 6–1 || Sheets (3–0) || Hamels (11–5) ||  || 42,239 || 2:44 || 55–44
|-  style="text-align:center; background:#bfb;"
| 100 || July 28 || Phillies || 2–1  || Minor (6–7) || Blanton (8–9) || Kimbrel (30) || 39,886 || 2:14 || 56–44
|-  style="text-align:center; background:#bfb;"
| 101 || July 29 || Phillies || 6–2 || Hudson (10–4) || Halladay (4–6) || || 23,726 || 2:55 || 57–44
|-  style="text-align:center; background:#bfb;"
| 102 || July 30 || Marlins || 8–2 || Hanson (12–5) || Buehrle (9–10) || || 22,264 || 2:55 || 58–44
|-  style="text-align:center; background:#bfb;"
| 103 || July 31 || Marlins || 7–1 || Medlen (2–1) || Nolasco (8–10) || || 21,819 || 2:42 || 59–44
|-

|-  style="text-align:center; background:#fbb;"
| 104 || August 1 || Marlins || 2–4 || Zambrano (6–9) || Sheets (3–1) || Cishek (5) || 18,133 || 3:03 || 59–45
|-  style="text-align:center; background:#bfb;"
| 105 || August 2 || Marlins || 6–1 || Martínez (5–2) || Eovaldi (2–7) || || 19,685 || 2:56 || 60–45
|-  style="text-align:center; background:#bfb;"
| 106 || August 3 || Astros || 4–1 || Hudson (11–4) || Galarraga (0–1) || Kimbrel (31) || 28,300 || 3:03 || 61–45
|-  style="text-align:center; background:#fbb;"
| 107 || August 4 || Astros || 2–3 || Harrell (9–7) || Maholm (9–7) || López (1) || 30,029 || 2:33 || 61–46
|-  style="text-align:center; background:#bfb;"
| 108 || August 5 || Astros || 6–1 || Venters (4–3) || Norris (5–9) || || 23,474 || 3:01 || 62–46
|-  style="text-align:center; background:#bfb;"
| 109 || August 6 || @ Phillies || 6–1 || Sheets (4–1) || Worley (6–7) || || 41,665 || 2:37 || 63–46
|-  style="text-align:center; background:#fbb;"
| 110 || August 7 || @ Phillies || 0–3 || Hamels (12–6) || Minor (6–8) || || 42,660 || 2:16 || 63–47
|-  style="text-align:center; background:#bfb;"
| 111 || August 8 || @ Phillies || 12–6 || Durbin (4–1) || Bastardo (2–4) || || 41,501 || 3:14 || 64–47
|-  style="text-align:center; background:#bfb;"
| 112 || August 10 || @ Mets || 4–0 || Maholm (10–7) || Harvey (1–3) || || 25,101 || 2:24 || 65–47
|-  style="text-align:center; background:#bfb;"
| 113 || August 11 || @ Mets || 9–3 || Medlen (3–1) || Santana (6–8) || || 30,388 || 2:44 || 66–47
|-  style="text-align:center; background:#fbb;"
| 114 || August 12 || @ Mets || 5–6 || Niese (9–6) || Sheets (4–2) || Rauch (2) || 24,891 || 2:46 || 66–48
|-  style="text-align:center; background:#fbb;"
| 115 || August 13 || Padres || 1–4 || Stults (3–2) || Minor (6–9) || Thayer (6) || 18,250 || 2:23 || 66–49
|-  style="text-align:center; background:#bfb;"
| 116 || August 14 || Padres || 6–0 || Hudson (12–4) || Richard (9–12) || || 16,427 || 2:37 || 67–49
|-  style="text-align:center; background:#bfb;"
| 117 || August 15 || Padres || 6–1 || Maholm (11–7) || Vólquez (7–9) || || 16,302 || 2:46 || 68–49 
|-  style="text-align:center; background:#bfb;"
| 118 || August 16 || Padres || 6–0 || Medlen (4–1) || Marquis (8–11) || || 33,157 || 2:30 || 69–49
|-  style="text-align:center; background:#bfb;"
| 119 || August 17 || Dodgers || 4–3 (11) || Venters (5–3) || League (0–6) || || 33,093 || 3:36 || 70–49
|-  style="text-align:center; background:#fbb;"
| 120 || August 18 || Dodgers || 2–6 || Harang (9–7) || Sheets (4–3) || Jansen (25) || 42,219 || 2:52 || 70–50
|-  style="text-align:center; background:#fbb;"
| 121 || August 19 || Dodgers || 0–5 || Billingsley (10–9) || Minor (6–10) || || 26,798 || 2:52 || 70–51
|-  style="text-align:center; background:#fbb;"
| 122 || August 20 || @ Nationals || 4–5 (13) || Stammen (6–1) || Martínez (5–3) || || 21,298 || 4:27 || 70–52
|-  style="text-align:center; background:#fbb;"
| 123 || August 21 || @ Nationals || 1–4 || Strasburg (15–5) || Maholm (11–8) || Clippard (28) || 33,888 || 2:24 || 70–53
|-  style="text-align:center; background:#bfb;"
| 124 || August 22 || @ Nationals || 5–1 || Medlen (5–1) || Detwiler (7–6) || || 29,111|| 2:51 || 71–53 
|-  style="text-align:center; background:#fbb;"
| 125 || August 23 || @ Giants || 2–5 || Zito (10–8) || Hanson (12–6) || Romo (6) || 41,645 || 2:53 || 71–54
|-  style="text-align:center; background:#fbb;"
| 126 || August 24 || @ Giants || 3–5 || Vogelsong (11–7) || Sheets (4–4) || López (4) || 41,486 || 2:24 || 71–55
|-  style="text-align:center; background:#bfb;"
| 127 || August 25 || @ Giants || 7–3 || Minor (7–10) || Bumgarner (14–8) || || 41,679 || 3:15 || 72–55
|-  style="text-align:center; background:#bfb;"
| 128 || August 26 || @ Giants || 7–1 || Hudson (13–4) || Lincecum (7–14) || || 41,735 || 2:55 || 73–55
|-  style="text-align:center; background:#fbb;"
| 129 || August 27 || @ Padres || 0–3 || Kelly (1–0) || Maholm (11–9) || Gregerson (2) || 20,590 || 2:24 || 73–56
|-  style="text-align:center; background:#bfb;"
| 130 || August 28 || @ Padres || 2–0 || Medlen (6–1) || Werner (1–1) || Kimbrel (32) || 20,955 || 2:33 || 74–56
|-  style="text-align:center; background:#fbb;"
| 131 || August 29 || @ Padres || 2–8 || Stults (5–2) || Hanson (12–7) || || 16,845 || 2:49 || 74–57
|-  style="text-align:center; background:#fbb;"
| 132 || August 31 || Phillies || 5–8 (10) || Lindblom (3–3) || Martínez (5–4) || Papelbon (31) || 31,203 || 3:21 || 74–58
|-

|-  style="text-align:center; background:#fbb;"
| 133 || September 1 || Phillies || 1–5 || Lee (4–7) || Hudson (13–5) || || 44,749 || 3:04 || 74–59
|-  style="text-align:center; background:#bfb;"
| 134 || September 2 || Phillies || 8–7 || Moylan (1–0) || Papelbon (3–6) || || 36,394 || 3:28 || 75–59
|-  style="text-align:center; background:#bfb;"
| 135 || September 3 || Rockies || 6–1 || Medlen (7–1) || Chatwood (4–4) || || 24,848 || 2:39 || 76–59
|-  style="text-align:center; background:#fbb;"
| 136 || September 4 || Rockies || 0–6 || Torres (4–1) || Hanson (12–8) || || 16,686 || 3:18 || 76–60
|-  style="text-align:center; background:#bfb;"
| 137 || September 5 || Rockies || 1–0 || Minor (8–10) || White (2–8) || Kimbrel (33) || 16,714 || 2:48 || 77–60
|-  style="text-align:center; background:#bfb;"
| 138 || September 6 || Rockies || 1–0 || Hudson (14–5) || Chacín (2–5) || Kimbrel (34) || 19,313 || 2:52 || 78–60
|-  style="text-align:center; background:#bfb;"
| 139 || September 7 || @ Mets || 3–0 || Maholm (12–9) || Niese (10–9) || Kimbrel (35) || 24,071 || 2:56 || 79–60
|-  style="text-align:center; background:#bfb;"
| 140 || September 8 || @ Mets || 11–3 || Medlen (8–1) || Hefner (2–6) || || 25,603 || 3:02 || 80–60
|-  style="text-align:center; background:#bfb;"
| 141 || September 9 || @ Mets || 3–2 (10) || Kimbrel (1–1) || Parnell (4–4) || Moylan (1) || 23,161 || 3:17 || 81–60
|-  style="text-align:center; background:#fbb;"
| 142 || September 10 || @ Brewers || 1–4 || Veras (4–4) || Venters (5–4) || Axford (28) || 34,395 || 3:09 || 81–61
|-  style="text-align:center; background:#fbb;"
| 143 || September 11 || @ Brewers || 0–5 || Estrada (3–6) || Hudson (14–6) || || 27,382 || 2:41 || 81–62
|-  style="text-align:center; background:#fbb;"
| 144 || September 12 || @ Brewers || 2–8 || Gallardo (15–8) || Maholm (12–10) || || 37,847 || 2:53 || 81–63
|-  style="text-align:center; background:#bfb;"
| 145 || September 14 || Nationals || 2–1 || Kimbrel (2–1)  || Burnett (1–2) || || 41,797 || 2:43 || 82–63
|-  style="text-align:center; background:#bfb;"
| 146 || September 15 || Nationals || 5–4 || O'Flaherty (3–0) || Mattheus (5–2) || Kimbrel (36) || 38,763 || 3:22 || 83–63
|-  style="text-align:center; background:#bfb;"
| 147 || September 16 || Nationals || 5–1 || Minor (9–10) || Gonzalez (19–8) || || 29,094 || 3:05 || 84–63
|-  style="text-align:center; background:#bfb;"
| 148 || September 17 || @ Marlins || 7–5 || Hudson (15–6) || LeBlanc (2–5) || Kimbrel (37) || 23,308 || 2:52 || 85–63
|-  style="text-align:center; background:#fbb;"
| 149 || September 18 || @ Marlins || 3–4 (10) || Bell (3–5) || Gearrin (0–1) || || 23,009 || 3:13 || 85–64
|-  style="text-align:center; background:#bfb;"
| 150 || September 19 || @ Marlins || 3–0 || Medlen (9–1) || Johnson (8–13) || Kimbrel (38) || 25,998 || 2:34 || 86–64
|-  style="text-align:center; background:#fbb;"
| 151 || September 21 || @ Phillies || 2–6 || Kendrick (10–11) || Hanson (12–9) ||  || 44,052 || 2:36 || 86–65
|-  style="text-align:center; background:#bfb;"
| 152 || September 22 || @ Phillies || 8–2 || Minor (10–10) || Halladay (10–8) || || 45,377 || 3:09 || 87–65
|-  style="text-align:center; background:#bfb;"
| 153 || September 23 || @ Phillies || 2–1 || Hudson (16–6) || Lee (6–8) || Kimbrel (39) || 43,968 || 2:31 || 88–65
|-  style="text-align:center; background:#bfb;"
| 154 || September 25 || Marlins || 4–3 || Kimbrel (3–1) || Dunn (0–3) || || 25,632 || 2:24 || 89–65
|-  style="text-align:center; background:#bfb;"
| 155 || September 26 || Marlins || 3–0 || Maholm (13–10) || Johnson (8–14) || Kimbrel (40) || 23,420 || 2:37 || 90–65
|-  style="text-align:center; background:#bfb;"
| 156 || September 27 || Marlins || 6–2 || Hanson (13–9) || Turner (2–5) || || 27,270 || 2:46 || 91–65
|-  style="text-align:center; background:#fbb;"
| 157 || September 28 || Mets || 1–3 || Niese (13–9) || Hudson (16–7) || Parnell (6) || 51,910 || 2:31 || 91–66
|-  style="text-align:center; background:#bfb;"
| 158 || September 29 || Mets || 2–0 || Minor (11–10) || Young (4–9) || Kimbrel (41) || 48,310 || 2:33 || 92–66
| 159 || September 30 || Mets || 6–2 || Medlen (10–1) || Mejía (1–2) || Kimbrel (42) || 50,635 || 2:50 || 93–66
|-  style="text-align:center; background:#fbb;"
| 160 || October 1|| @ Pirates || 1–2 || Locke (1–3) || Maholm (13–11)  || Hughes (2) || 15,009 || 2:38 || 93–67
| 161 || October 2 || @ Pirates || 1–5 || Correia (12–11) || Hanson (13–10) || || 15,727 || 2:38 || 93–68
|-  style="text-align:center; background:#bfb;"
| 162 || October 3 || @ Pirates || 4–0 || Avilán (1–0) || Burnett (16–10) || || 20,615 || 2:45 || 94–68
|-

Season standings

NL East standings

NL Wild Card

Record vs. opponents

Note that the teams not included in the wild card standings are currently leading their divisions and that the top two teams earn Wild Card berths.

Roster

Postseason

Wild Card Game

Player statistics

Batting
Note: G = Games played; AB = At bats; R = Runs scored; H = Hits; AVG = Batting average; HR = Home runs; RBI = Runs batted in

Complete batting stats can be found here.

Pitching

Starting pitchers
Note: G = Games pitched; GS = Games started; IP = Innings pitched; W = Wins; L = Losses; ERA = Earned run average; SO = Strikeouts; WHIP = Walks and hits per innings pitched

Relief pitchers
Note: G = Games pitched; W = Wins; L = Losses; SV = Saves; HLD = Holds; IP = Innings pitched; ERA = Earned run average; SO = Strikeouts; WHIP = Walks and hits per inning pitched

Complete pitching stats can be found here.

Farm system

LEAGUE CHAMPIONS: Lynchburg

References

External links
2012 Atlanta Braves season at Baseball Reference
2012 Atlanta Braves season Official Site

Atlanta Braves seasons
Atlanta Braves
Atlanta Braves